Trevor Wilson (born 10 December 1950) is  a former Australian rules footballer who played with Richmond and Footscray in the Victorian Football League (VFL).

Notes

External links 
		
		
 Richmond Football Club history. By Rhett Bartlett + Trevor Ruddell		
		
		

Living people
1950 births
Australian rules footballers from Victoria (Australia)
Richmond Football Club players
Western Bulldogs players